"You can click, but you can't hide" is an advertising campaign run jointly by several international associations, most notably the MPAA (now the MPA) and the GVU, as part of the larger "Respect Copyrights" campaign against peer-to-peer file sharing of motion pictures. The associations have long alleged that Internet file sharing, or maintaining a file sharing tracker, network or search engine, constitutes copyright infringement since the practice hurts their revenues.

The phrase is an adaptation of the phrase "You can run but you can't hide," a statement attributed to American boxer Joe Louis. The "Illegal Downloading: Inappropriate for all ages" campaign logo is based on the MPAA Rating System logos.

In addition to a print and billboard campaign, BitTorrent tracker websites closed between October 2004 and May 2005 due to legal action by the associations have replaced their front page with the campaign's logo and an accompanying message:

LokiTorrent controversy
The associations have also obtained records from some closed tracker sites, which could be used to trace individual users. The administrator of one such site, LokiTorrent, closed the site and turned over its logs, amidst controversy, as part of a settlement ending a 2005 copyright infringement lawsuit filed by MPAA studios against him. The anti-"piracy" campaign's signature replaced the content of the website upon its shutting down.

Comparison to other campaigns
The arresting nature of the graphics, and the use of scare tactics in this campaign is a marked difference from previous large-scale copyright-promotion campaigns such as Home Taping is Killing Music and Who Makes Movies?, which appealed to the consumer's interest in the art form and the consumer's compassion for movie industry workers. John G. Malcolm, former Senior Vice President and Director of Worldwide Anti-Piracy for the MPAA, has been quoted saying that the goal of the campaign is to "make an example of" internet movie thieves and other pirates. Former MPAA chief Dan Glickman insisted in a statement to film P2P traders that the MPAA "will find you, and you will be held responsible".

See also
 Beware of illegal video cassettes
 Don't Copy That Floppy
 Home Recording Rights Coalition
 Home Taping Is Killing Music
 Knock-off Nigel
 Piracy is theft
 Public information film (PIF)
 Public service announcement
 Sony Corp. of America v. Universal City Studios, Inc.
 Spin (public relations)
 Steal This Film
 Warez
 Who Makes Movies?
 You Wouldn't Steal a Car

References

External links 
Screengrab of the LokiTorrent site featuring the MPAA splash screen

American advertising slogans
2004 neologisms
Music industry
Copyright campaigns
Motion Picture Association
Political catchphrases